Valle de la Luna, also calling Killa Qhichwa  (Moon Valley) is situated about 10 kilometers from downtown La Paz, in the Pedro Domingo Murillo Province, La Paz Department, Bolivia.  It consists of an area where erosion has worn away the majority of a mountain, composed primarily of clay rather than rock, leaving tall spires.  It is similar to another zone of La Paz that is known as El Valle de las Animas (The Valley of the Souls). It is an important site of the famous holiday, Dias de los Muertos (Day of the Dead).

Because the mineral content of the mountains varies greatly between individual mountains, the sides of the mountains are different colors, creating striking optical illusions. A majority of them are a clear beige or light brown color, but some are almost red, with sections of dark violet.

External links

Valleys of Bolivia
Landforms of La Paz Department (Bolivia)